Galo Ador Jr. (September 1, 1969 – March 10, 2008) was a comic book author of Filipino descent.

Early life
Born Galo T. Ador Jr. on September 1, 1969 in Manila, Philippines. He was the son of Galo Ador Sr.

Career
Galo was active in comics in the 90′s until Graphic Arts Service shut down, causing him to move to TV writing. Galo is best known as a TV writer who worked on Francisco V. Coching's Pedro Penduko, Alpha Omega Girl, Kapitan Aksiyon, Agent X44 and many more during the last couple of years.

Galo is one of the founders of Back Door Publishing, an independent comic book company which released Dark Pages in 2002.

Filmography

Writer

Story and screenplay

Script supervisor

References

1969 births
2008 deaths
Filipino cartoonists
Writers from Metro Manila
People from Manila
People from Quezon City